The Periodic Report of the United States of America to the United Nations Committee Against Torture is periodically submitted by the United States government, through the State Department, to the United Nations Committee Against Torture. In October 2005, the report focused on the detention of suspects in the War on Terror, including those held in Guantánamo Bay.  This particular Periodic Report is significant as the first official response of the U.S. government to allegations that prisoners are mistreated in Guantánamo Bay and in Afghanistan. The report denies those allegations. The report does not address detainees held by the Central Intelligence Agency.

The original text for the report is available:
State Department original documents pertaining to Reports to U.N. on Second Periodic Report of the United States of America to the Committee Against Torture, and Third Periodic Report.
Update to Annex One of the Second Periodic Report October 21, 2005

See also
Enemy combatant & Unlawful combatant
Enhanced interrogation techniques
Extraordinary rendition
Torture
War Crimes Act of 1996
Criticisms of the War on Terrorism

Iraq War
Extrajudicial prisoners of the United States
Torture
International criminal law
Law of war
Reports of the United States government
United States and the United Nations